The 2014 Idaho State Bengals football team represented Idaho State University as a member of the Big Sky Conference during the 2014 NCAA Division I FCS football season. Led by fourth-year head coach Mike Kramer, the Bengals compiled an overall record of 8–4 with a mark of 6–2 in conference play, placing in a three-way tie for second in the Big Sky. Idaho State played their home games at Holt Arena in Pocatello, Idaho.

Schedule

Game summaries

@ Utah

Game officials: Referee - Jack Folliard, Umpire - Douglas Wilson, Head Linesman - Bob Day, Line Judge - Jeff Robinson, Side Judge - Aaron Santi, Field Judge - Brad Glenn, Back Judge - Steve Hudson, Head Replay Official - Jim Northcott

@ Utah State

Chadron State

Sacramento State

@ Eastern Washington

Simon Fraser

Southern Utah

@ Northern Colorado

@ Portland State

Cal Poly

@ Montana State

Weber State

References

Idaho State
Idaho State Bengals football seasons
Idaho State Bengals football